Ciudad Altamirano is a village in Michoacán, Mexico.

References

Populated places in Michoacán